Urnyak (Ürnäk) is a rural locality (a village) in Sayranovsky Selsoviet, Tuymazinsky District, Bashkortostan, Russia. The population was 7 as of 2010. There is 1 street.

Geography 
Urnyak is located 49 km southeast of Tuymazy (the district's administrative centre) by road. Sayranovo is the nearest rural locality.

References 

Rural localities in Tuymazinsky District